This is a list of moths of the family Noctuidae (sensu Kitching & Rawlins, 1999) that are found in India. It also acts as an index to the species articles and forms part of the full List of moths of India. Subfamilies and species are listed alphabetically, though the list order of Catocalinae is based on Holloway, 2005. Species listed are those extracted from Kendrick (2002 [2003]) and will be augmented by the species listed in Hampson (vol. 2, 1894; vol. 3, 1895), once the updated nomenclature has been worked out and cross referenced against LepIndex.

Subfamily Acronictinae
 Acronicta pruinosa (Guenée, 1852)
 Apsarasa radians
 Bryophilina mollicula (Graeser, 1888 [1889])
 Tycracrona obliqua Moore, 1882

Subfamily Aganainae
 Aganais ficus Fabricius, 1775
 Asota caricae (Fabricius, 1775)
 Asota egens indica Jordan, 1897
 Asota egens andamana Moore, 1877
 Asota ficus (Fabricius, 1775)
 Asota heliconia (Linnaeus, 1758)
 Asota plaginota Butler, 1875
 Asota plana (Butler, 1881)
 Asota tortuosa Moore, 1872
 Peridrome orbicularis Walker 1854
 Peridrome subfascia Walker, 1854
 Sommeria marchalii Walker 1864
 Neochera dominia Cramer, 1780
 Neochera inops (Walker, 1854)
 Neochera privata Walker, 1862
 Sarbanissa transiens

Subfamily Agaristinae
 Aegocera bimacula Walker, 1854
 Aegocera venulia (Cramer, 1777)
 Episteme arctopsa (Chu & Chen, 1962)
 Exsula dentatrix (Westwood, 1848)
 Pimprana atkinsoni Moore, 1879
 Sarbanissa albifascia (Walker, 1865)

Subfamily Bagisarinae
 Bagisara plagiata (Walker, 1858)
 Chasmina judicata (Walker, 1858)
 Sphragifera rejecta (Fabricius, 1775)
 Xanthodes intersepta Guenée, 1852
 Xanthodes transversa Guenée, 1852

Subfamily Catocalinae
 Achaea janata (Linnaeus, 1758)
 Acharya crassicornis Moore, 1882
 Aedia leucomelas (Linnaeus, 1758)
 Aedia perdicipennis (Moore, 1882)
 Anisoneura aluco (Fabricius, 1775)
 Anisoneura salebrosa Guenée, 1852
 Anomis erosa Hübner 1821
 Anomis figlina Butler, 1889
 Anomis flava (Fabricius 1775)
 Anomis impasta Guenée 1852
 Anomis involuta (Walker 1858)
 Anomis lyona (Swinhoe 1919)
 Anomis mesogona (Walker 1858)
 Anomis nigritarsis (Walker 1858)
 Anomis sabulifera (Guenée 1852)
 Anticarsia irrorata (Fabricius, 1781)
 Arcte coerula (Guenée, 1852)
 Arsacia rectalis (Walker, 1863)
 Artena dotata (Fabricius, 1794)
 Athyrmina birthana (Swinhoe, 1905)
 Attonda adspersa (Felder & Rogenhofer, 1874)
 Avitta fasciosa Moore, 1882
 Bamra mundata (Walker, 1858)
 Bastilla absentimacula (Guenée, 1852)
 Bastilla amygdalis (Moore, [1885] 1884-1887)
 Bastilla analis (Guenée, 1852)
 Bastilla arcuata (Moore, 1887)
 Bastilla crameri (Moore, [1885] 1884-1887)
 Bastilla fulvotaenia (Guenée, 1852)
 Bastilla joviana (Stoll, 1782)
 Bastilla maturata (Walker, 1858)
 Bastilla maturescens (Walker, 1858)
 Bastilla praetermissa (Warren, 1913)
 Bastilla simillima (Guenée, 1852)
 Blasticorhinus rivulosa (Walker, 1865)
 Bocula caradrinoides Guenée, 1852
 Bocula diffisa (Swinhoe, 1890)
 Bocula marginata (Moore, 1882)
 Bocula pallens (Moore, 1882)
 Buzara onelia (Guenée, 1852)
 Calesia dasyptera (Kollar, 1844)
 Calesia haemorrhoa Guenée, 1852
 Calyptra minuticornis (Guenée, 1852)
 Calyptra pseudobicolor (Bänziger, 1979)
 Catephia dentifera (Moore, 1882)
 Catocala tapestrina Moore, 1882
 Chalciope mygdon (Cramer, 1777)
 Chilkasa perhamata (Hampson, 1894)
 Coarica fasciata Moore, 1882
 Condate angulina (Guenée, 1852)
 Corcobara angulipennis Moore, 1882
 Cosmophila flava (Fabricius, 1775)
 Crithote horridipes Walker, 1864
 Cultripalpa partita Guenée, 1852
 Cyclodes omma (Hoeven, 1840)
 Daddala lucilla (Butler, 1881)
 Daddala quadrisignata Walker, 1865
 Dierna patibulum (Fabricius, 1794)
 Dinumma deponens Walker, 1858
 Dinumma placens Walker, 1858
 Diomea rotundata Walker, [1858] 1857
 Dordura aliena Walker, 1865
 Dysgonia stuposa (Fabricius, 1794)
 Egnasia accingalis Walker, 1858
 Egnasia caduca swinhoe, 1892
 Egnasia castanea Moore, 1882
 Egnasia ephyrodalis Walker, 1858
 Egnasia fasciata (Moore, 1882)
 Egnasia mesotypa Swinhoe, 1906
 Egnasia ochreivena Hampson, 1894
 Egnasia polia Hampson, 1891
 Egnasia rectilineata Swinhoe, 1890
 Egnasia participalis Walker, 1858
 Egnasia sinuosa Moore, 1882
 Egnasia tripuncta Swinhoe, 1890
 Entomogramma fautrix Guenée, 1852
 Ercheia cyllaria (Cramer, 1779)
 Ercheia umbrosa Butler, 1881
 Erebus macrops (Linnaeus, 1770)
 Ericeia eriophora (Guenée, 1852)
 Ericeia inangulata (Guenée, 1852)
 Ericeia pertendens (Walker, 1858)
 Erygia apicalis Guenée, 1852
 Eudocima homaena Hübner, [1823] 1816
 Eudocima hypermnestra (Stoll, 1780)
 Eudocima phalonia (Linnaeus, 1763)
 Eudocima salaminia (Cramer, 1777)
 Eudocima tyrannus (Guenée, 1852)
 Eutrogia morosa (Moore, 1882)
 Falana sordida Moore, 1882
 Gesonia obeditalis Walker, [1859] 1858
 Goniocraspedon mistura (Swinhoe, 1891)
 Gonitis involuta Walker, [1858] 1857
 Gonitis mesogona Walker, [1858] 1857
 Grammodes geometrica (Fabricius, 1775)
 Hepatica irrorata (Wileman & South, 1917)
 Hepatica linealis (Leech, 1889)
 Hulodes caranea (Cramer, 1780)
 Hypersypnoides submarginata (Walker, 1865)
 Hypocala deflorata (Fabricius, 1794)
 Hypocala rostrata (Fabricius, 1794)
 Hypocala subsatura Guenée, 1852
 Hypocala violacea Butler, 1879
 Hypopyra ossigera Guenée, 1852
 Hypopyra vespertilio (Fabricius, 1787)
 Hyposemansis singha Guenée, 1852
 Hypospila bolinoides Guenée, 1852
 Ischyja ferrifracta (Walker, [1863] 1864)
 Lacera alope Cramer, 1781
 Lacera noctilio (Fabricius, 1794)
 Lacera procellosa Butler, 1879
 Lophathrum comprimens (Walker, 1858)
 Loxioda fasciosa (Moore 1882)
 Loxioda similis Moore, 1882
 Lycimna polymesata Walker, 1860
 Macaldenia palumba (Guenée, 1852)
 Marapana pulverata (Guenée, 1852)
 Mecodina aequilinea Hampson, 1926
 Mocis frugalis (Fabricius, 1775)
 Mocis undata (Fabricius, 1775)
 Nagadeba indecoralis Walker, [1886] 1865
 Ommatophora luminosa (Cramer, 1780)
 Ophisma gravata Guenée, 1852
 Ophiusa disjungens (Walker, 1858)
 Ophiusa indistincta (Moore, 1882)
 Ophiusa olista (Swinhoe, 1893)
 Ophiusa tirhaca (Cramer, 1780)
 Ophiusa triphaenoides (Walker, 1858)
 Oraesia emarginata (Fabricius, 1794)
 Oraesia excavata (Butler, 1878)
 Oxyodes scrobiculata (Fabricius, 1775)
 Pandesma anysa Guenée, 1852
 Pandesma quenavadi Guenée, 1852
 Pangrapta albistigma (Hampson, 1898)
 Pantura rufifrons (Moore, 1887)
 Pantydia metaspila (Walker, [1858] 1857)
 Pindara illibata (Fabricius, 1775)
 Platyja ciacula Swinhoe, 1893
 Platyja umminea (Cramer, 1780)
 Plecoptera luteiceps (Walker, 1865)
 Plecoptera oculata (Moore, 1882)
 Plecoptera recta (Pagenstacher, 1886)
 Plecoptera reflexa Guenée, 1852
 Plecoptera quadrilineata (Moore 1882)
 Plecoptera uniformis (Moore, 1882)
 Plusiodonta coelonota (Kollar, 1844)
 Polydesma boarmoides Guenée, 1852
 Pseudosphetta Moorei (Cotes & Swinhoe, 1885)
 Psimada quadripennis Walker, 1858
 Raparna transversa Moore, 1882
 Rema costimacula (Guenée, 1852)
 Rhesala imparata Walker, 1858
 Saroba pustulifera Walker, 1865
 Sarobides inconclusa (Walker, [1863] 1864)
 Schistorhynx argentistriga Hampson, 1898
 Serrodes campana Guenée, 1852
 Sphingomorpha chlorea (Cramer, 1777)
 Spirama retorta (Clerck, 1759)
 Sympis rufibasis Guenée, 1852
 Talapoptera duplexa (Moore, 1882)
 Tamba apicata (Hampson, 1902)
 Thalatta fasciosa Moore, 1882
 Throana pectinifer (Hampson, 1898)
 Thyas coronata (Fabricius, 1775)
 Thyas juno (Dalman, 1823)
 Tinolius eburneigutta Walker, 1855
 Tinolius hypsana Swinhoe, 1889
 Tochara creberrima (Walker, 1858)
 Trigonodes hyppasia (Cramer, 1779)
 Ugia insuspecta Galsworthy, 1997
 Ugia mediorufa (Hampson, 1894)
 Ugia transversa (Moore, 1882)

Subfamily Condicinae
 Bagada poliomera (Hampson, 1908)
 Condica albigutta (Wileman, 1912)
 Condica dolorosa (Walker, 1865)
 Condica illecta (Walker, 1865)
 Perigea chinensis Wallengren, 1860

Subfamily Eriopinae
 Callopistria aethiops Butler, 1878
 Callopistria guttulalis Hampson, 1906
 Callopistria juventina (Stoll, 1782)
 Callopistria palcodoides (Guenée, 1862)
 Callopistria repleta Walker, [1858] 1857

Subfamily Eustrotiinae
 Amyna octo (Guenée, 1852)
 Amyna punctum (Fabricius, 1794)
 Autoba abrupta (Walker, 1865)
 Autoba angulifera (Moore, 1882)
 Autoba obscura (Moore, 1882)
 Autoba rubra (Hampson, 1902)
 Catoblemma semialba (Hampson, 1902)
 Deltote fuscicilia Hampson, 1891
 Deltote marginata Walker, 1866
 Eublemma albipennis Hampson, 1910
 Eublemma anachoresis (Wallengren, 1863)
 Eublemma antoninae Nagaraja & Nagarkatti, 1970
 Eublemma baccalix (Swinhoe, 1886)
 Eublemma bifasciata (Moore, 1881)
 Eublemma bulla (Swinhoe, 1884)
 Eublemma cochylioides (Guenée, 1852)
 Eublemma conspersa (Butler, 1880)
 Eublemma dimidialis (Fabricius, 1794)
 Eublemma epistrota Hampson, 1910
 Eublemma exigua (Walker, [1858])
 Eublemma miasma (Hampson, 1891)
 Eublemma parva (Hübner, [1808])
 Eublemma pudica (Snellen, 1880)
 Eublemma pulchra (Swinhoe, 1886)
 Eublemma quadrilineata (Moore, 1881)
 Eublemma ragusana (Freyer, 1845)
 Eublemma rivula (Moore, 1882)
 Eublemma roseana (Moore, 1881)
 Eublemma sarcosia Hampson, 1910
 Eublemma trifasciata (Moore, 1881)
 Eustrotia marginata (Walker, 1866)
 Hyperstrotia molybdota Hampson, 1910
 Lithacodia crotopha (Swinhoe, 1905)
 Maliattha quadripartita (Walker, 1865)
 Maliattha separata Walker, 1863
 Maliattha signifera (Walker, [1858] 1857)
 Micardia pulcherrima (Moore, 1867)
 Ozarba albimarginata (Hampson, 1895)
 Ozarba badia (Swinhoe, 1886)
 Ozarba bipars Hampson, 1891
 Ozarba brunnea (Leech, 1900)
 Oruza divisa (Walker, 1862)
 Ozarba excisa Hampson, 1891
 Ozarba glaucescens Hampson, 1910
 Ozarba hemiphaea (Hampson, 1907)
 Ozarba hypenoides (Butler, 1889)
 Ozarba incondita Butler, 1889
 Ozarba itwarra Swinhoe, 1885
 Ozarba mallarba Swinhoe, 1885
 Ozarba pallida Hampson, 1910
 Ozarba phlebitis Hampson, 1910
 Ozarba punctigera Walker, 1865
 Ozarba rectifascia (Hampson, 1894)
 Ozarba rectificata Berio, 1950
 Ozarba reducta Berio, 1940
 Ozarba rufula Hampson, 1910
 Ozarba semirubra Hampson, 1910
 Ozarba uberosa (Swinhoe, 1885)
 Ozarba umbrifera Hampson, 1910
 Ozarba venata Butler, 1889

Subfamily Euteliinae
 Anuga multiplicans (Walker, 1858)
 Eutelia adulatricoides (Mell, 1943)
 Eutelia favillatrixoides Poole, 1989
 Eutelia geyeri (Felder & Rogenhofer, 1874)
 Paectes subapicalis (Walker, [1858] 1857)

Subfamily Hadeninae
 Apamea sodalis (Butler, 1878)
 Aeologramma albiscripta (Hampson, 1897)
 Antha grata (Butler, 1881)
 Apsarasa radians (Westwood, 1848)
 Athetis bremusa (Swinhoe, 1885)
 Athetis cognata (Moore, 1882)
 Athetis delecta (Moore, 1881)
 Athetis sincera (Swinhoe, 1889)
 Athetis stellata (Moore, 1882)
 Callyna monoleuca Walker, 1858
 Callyna semivitta Moore, 1882
 Dyptergina indica (Moore, 1867)
 Elusa antennata (Moore, 1882)
 Feliniopsis hyperythra Galsworthy, 1997
 Feliniopsis indistans (Guenée, 1852)
 Mythimna byssina Swinhoe, 1886
 Mythimna compta Moore, 1881
 Mythimna curvilinea Hampson, 1891
 Mythimna fasciata (Moore, 1881)
 Mythimna formosana Butler, 1880
 Mythimna Moorei (Swinhoe, 1902)
 Mythimna pallidicosta (Hampson, 1894)
 Mythimna separata (Walker, 1865)
 Mythimna snelleni Hreblay, 1996
 Mythimna tangala Felder & Rogenhofer, 1874
 Mythimna yu Guenée, 1852
 Nonagria grisescens (Hampson, 1910)
 Sasunaga tenebrosa (Moore, 1867)
 Spodoptera mauritia (Boisduval, 1833)
 Tiracola aureata Holloway, 1989
 Tiracola plagiata (Walker, 1857)
 Trachea auriplena (Walker, 1857)
 Xylostola indistincta (Moore, 1882)

Subfamily Heliothinae
 Helicoverpa armigera (Hübner, [1809])
 Heliothis cruentata (Moore, 1881)
 Heliothis irrorata (Moore, 1881)

Subfamily Noctuinae
 Agrotis segetum ([Denis & Schiffermüller], 1775)
 Diarsia canescens (Butler, 1878)

Subfamily Pantheinae
Antitrisuloides catocalina (Moore, 1882)
Viridistria striatovirens (Moore, 1883)
Viridistria thoracica (Moore, 1882)
Viridistria viridipicta (Hampson, 1902)

Subfamily Plusiinae
 Agrapha furcifera (Walker, [1858] 1857)
 Chrysodeixis acuta (Walker, [1858] 1857)
 Chrysodeixis chalcites (Esper, 1789)
 Chrysodeixis eriosoma (Doubleday, 1843)
 Ctenoplusia agnata (Staudinger, 1892)
 Anadevidia peponis (Fabricius, 1775)
 Dactyloplusia impulsa (Walker, 1865)
 Sclerogenia jessica (Butler, 1878)
 Scriptoplusia nigriluna (Walker, [1858] 1857)
 Trichoplusia daubei (Boisduval, 1840)
 Trichoplusia intermixta (Warren, 1913)
 Trichoplusia ni (Hübner, [1803])
 Zonoplusia ochreata (Walker, 1865)

Subfamily Stictopterinae
 Gyrtona todara (Hampson, 1912)
 Lophoptera anthyalus (Hampson, 1894)
 Lophoptera hemithyris (Hampson, 1905)
 Lophoptera longipennis (Moore, 1882)
 Lophoptera squammigera Guenée, 1852

Subfamily Strepsimanninae
 Luceria oculalis (Moore, 1877)

See also
Noctuidae
Moths
Lepidoptera
List of moths of India

References
 Hampson, G.F. et al. (1892-1937) Fauna of British India Including Ceylon and Burma - Moths. Vols. 1-5 cxix + 2813 p - 1295 figs - 1 table - 15 pl (12 in col.)
 Holloway, J. D., 2005. The Moths of Borneo: Family Noctuidae, subfamily Catocalinae. Malayan Nature Journal 58: 1-529.
 Kendrick, R.C., 2002 [2003]. Moths (Insecta: Lepidoptera) of Hong Kong. Ph.D. thesis, The University of Hong Kong. xvi + 660 pp. 
 Kitching, I.J., & Rawlins, J.E., 1999. Noctuoidea. pp. 355–401 in Kristensen, N.P. (ed.). Handbook of Zoology: Bd. 4. Arthropoda: Insecta. Teilbd. 35, Lepidoptera, Moths and Butterflies. Vol. 1. Evolution, Systematics, and Biogeography. W.de Gruyter, Berlin. 
 Savela, Markku. Website on Lepidoptera and Some Other Life Forms - Page on family Noctuidae (Accessed on 8 July 2007).
 in German Lödl, 1998. Revision der Gattungen Acidon Hampson, 1896 und Hiaspis Walker, (1866) subfam.comb.n. (Lepidoptera. Noctuidae. Hypeninae). Quadrifina Band 1: 25-62

External links
Aganaidae (Snouted tigers) of South-East Asia and the Indo-Australian Tropics Indonesia in particular by Jaap Zwier The Netherlands 

 
x
M